Aleksandr Anatolyevich Orlov (born 18 January 1983 in Bratsk, Irkutsk Oblast, Russia) is a Russian curler and curling coach.

He is Master of Sports of Russia of International Class (curling, 2016).

He is a sports journalist, founder and owner of a biggest non-governing Russian curling site "CurlingRussia" ("Кёрлинг в России (Curling in Russia)", temporary closed in 2020).

He is founder and owner of the first Russian curling equipment shop "All for curling".

Teams

Men's

Mixed

Mixed doubles

Record as a coach of national teams

References

External links

Team Medved

Living people
1983 births
People from Bratsk
Sportspeople from Irkutsk Oblast
Russian male curlers
Russian curling champions
Russian curling coaches
Russian sports journalists